Mutshatsha may refer to:
 Mutshatsha, Katanga
 Mutshatsha Territory